Zoltán Szigeti (17 December 1932 – 12 May 2009) was a Hungarian sprint canoer who competed in the mid to late 1950s. He won a gold medal in the K-4 1000 m event at the 1954 ICF Canoe Sprint World Championships in Mâcon. Szigeti competed in the K-2 1000 m event at the 1956 Summer Olympics in Melbourne, but was eliminated in the heats and did not advance to the final.

References

External links

1932 births
2009 deaths
Canoeists at the 1956 Summer Olympics
Hungarian male canoeists
Olympic canoeists of Hungary
ICF Canoe Sprint World Championships medalists in kayak
20th-century Hungarian people